The 2015 FBD Insurance League was an inter-county and colleges Gaelic football competition in the province of Connacht. As well as the five county teams, three colleges' teams competed: Institute of Technology, Sligo, NUI Galway and Galway-Mayo Institute of Technology (GMIT). Roscommon won.

Format
The teams are drawn into two groups of four teams. Each team plays the other teams in its group once, earning 2 points for a win and 1 for a draw. The two group winners play in the final.

Results

Group A

Roscommon are placed ahead of Mayo as they won the head-to-head game between the teams.
Mayo 1-13 NUIG 1-11
Roscommon 0-14 IT Sligo 0-5
Roscommon 0-9 NUIG 0-10
Mayo 0-15 IT Sligo 0-6
Mayo 1-10 Roscommon 2-12
NUIG 0-8 IT Sligo 0-8

Group B

Sligo 0-5 Galway 0-14
Leitrim 3-17 GMIT 1-7
Leitrim 1-9 Galway 0-13
Sligo 1-13 GMIT 0-8
Galway 1-13 GMIT 0-5
Leitrim 1-10 Sligo 2-9

Final

References

FBD Insurance League
FBD Insurance League